The Solothurn S-18/100 20 mm anti-tank cannon was a German and Swiss anti-tank rifle used during the Second World War. It had a semi-automatic action in a bullpup configuration. As a result of its large, powerful ammunition, the gun had a tremendous recoil, and its size made portability difficult. The feed was either from a five or (more usually) ten-round magazine that was attached horizontally to the left side of the gun. The gun used 20×105mm belted-case ammunition which it shared with the S 18-350 aircraft cannon that was developed from the rifle. A Finnish source gives armour penetration of the gun (probably achieved with the Hungarian APHE-T round, since it was the only type used in Finland) as 20mm at a 60-degree angle at 100-metre distance, decreasing to 16mm at 500 metres.
A variant of this design, the Solothurn-Arsenal, was manufactured without license in Estonia before WW2; however only 20 were produced prior to Soviet occupation.

In March 1940, with funds collected in Switzerland to help the Finnish war effort in the Winter War, Finland bought twelve S 18-154 anti-tank rifles from Solothurn, though the purchaser was nominally the Swiss army. The weapons arrived into Finland during the spring after the war had ended, but they were later used in the Continuation War. However, the guns were soon found to be obsolete in their intended role. Various models of the S-18 series, including the Solothurn S-18/1000 and the Solothurn S-18/1100 were also used by Switzerland, the Kingdom of Hungary, Nazi Germany, the Kingdom of Italy, Kingdom of Romania, and the Netherlands.

The Solothurn firearms company was owned by the German firm Rheinmetall, and used the Swiss company to manufacture arms which were prohibited for manufacture by any German firm, to get around arms limitations imposed upon them at the end of the First World War.

Gallery

Users
 - 308 commanded in 1936 
: 4 bought in 1936 for testing, reverse-engineered as Solothurn-Arsenal
: 12 S-18/154
: some for trials
: 1 S-18/100 bought in 1936 for comparison with type 97 automatic cannon
: Produced under license as 36M 20mm Nehézpuska. Used on 38M Toldi and 39M Csaba
: some for trials in 1934
: 6 for trials in 1937
: some for trials
: 2 S-18/100 purchased in 1939 for trials at Aberdeen Proving Ground
: from 1942 as anti-material rifles

See also
Anti-tank rifle
Boys anti-tank rifle
Lahti L-39
Mauser 1918 T-Gewehr
Panzerbüchse 39
PTRD-41 ― Mass-produced competing design to the PTRS
PTRS-41 ― Mass-produced competing design to the PTRD
Type 97 automatic cannon
Wz. 35 anti-tank rifle
Weapons employed in the Slovak–Hungarian War

Notes

References
 Pitkänen, Mika & Simpanen, Timo. 20 mm Suomessa - Aseet ja ampumatarvikkeet ennen vuotta 1945  20 mm in Finland - Weapons and Ammunition prior to 1945. Apali, 2007. 
 

20mm sniper rifles
20 mm artillery
Semi-automatic rifles
Anti-tank rifles
Anti-materiel rifles
Military equipment introduced in the 1930s